The Health Maintenance Organization Act of 1973 (Pub. L. 93-222 codified as 42 U.S.C. §300e) is a United States statute enacted on December 29, 1973.  The Health Maintenance Organization Act, informally known as the federal HMO Act, is a federal law that provides for a trial federal program to promote and encourage the development of health maintenance organizations (HMOs).  The federal HMO Act amended the Public Health Service Act, which Congress passed in 1944.  The principal sponsor of the federal HMO Act was Sen. Edward M. Kennedy (MA).

Principles 

President Richard Nixon signed bill S.14 into law on December 29, 1973.

It included a mandated Dual Choice under Section 1310 of the Act.

Health Maintenance Organization (HMO) is a term first conceived of by Dr. Paul M. Ellwood, Jr. 
The concept for the HMO Act began with discussions Ellwood and his Interstudy group members had with Nixon administration advisors who were looking for a way to curb medical inflation. Ellwood's work led to the eventual HMO Act of 1973.

It provided grants and loans to provide, start, or expand a Health Maintenance Organization (HMO); removed certain state restrictions for federally qualified HMOs; and required employers with 25 or more employees to offer federally certified HMO options IF they offered traditional health insurance to employees. It did not require employers to offer health insurance.  The Act solidified the term HMO and gave HMOs greater access to the employer-based market. The Dual Choice provision expired in 1995.

Benefits offered to Federally qualified HMOs 

Money for development
Override of specific restrictive State laws
Mandate offered to specific employers to offer an optional HMO plan as part of their employee benefits package

Qualifications of a Federally qualified HMO 

To become federally qualified, the HMO must meet these requirements:

Deliver a more comprehensive package of benefits;
Be made available to more broadly representative population;
Be offered on a more equitable basis;
More participation of consumers;
All at the same or lower price than traditional forms of insurance coverage

Effects of the act 

Federal Financial Assistance for  developing HMOs—Assisted individual HMOs in obtaining endorsement (referred to as qualification) from the federal government
Marketing Support through Dual Choice Mandate—Required employers to offer coverage from at least one federally qualified HMO to all employees (dual choice).

Problem areas 

Definition of "Medical Group"
Comprehensive Benefits and Limitations on Copays
Open Enrollment and Community Rating
Mandatory "Dual Choice"
Delay in Implementation

Amendments to the HMO Act of 1973 

 October 8, 1976: Health Maintenance Organization Amendments of 1976, P.L. 94-460,  
 November 1, 1978: Health Maintenance Organization Amendments of 1978, P.L. 95-559, 
 July 10, 1979: Joint resolution to amend the Public Health Services Act and related health laws to correct printing and other technical errors, P.L. 96-32, 
 August 13, 1981: Omnibus Budget Reconciliation Act of 1981, P.L. 97-35, 
 October 24, 1988: Health Maintenance Organization Amendments of 1988, P.L. 100-517, 
 August 21, 1996: Health Insurance Portability and Accountability Act (HIPAA), P.L. 104-191,

Further reading

Definitions 
A Health Maintenance Organization (HMO) is a managed care plan that incorporates financing and delivery of an inclusive set of health care services to individuals enrolled in a network.

References 

1973 in law
Act
United States federal health legislation